Jason Bahamboula (born 15 June 2001) is a French professional footballer who plays as a winger for the Primeira Liga club Vitória Guimarães.

Club career
Bahamboula is a youth product of the French club Caen, and moved to Vitória Guimarães in January 2020 where he was originally assigned to their reserves. He made his professional and Primeira Liga debut with Vitória Guimarães as a late substitute in a 1–0 loss to Casa Pia.

Personal life
Born in France, Bahamboula is of Congo-Brazzaville descent. He was born to a family of footballers; he is the youngest brother of the footballers Plaisir, Dolan and Dylan Bahamboula, and cousin of Yven Moyo.

References

External links
 

2001 births
Living people
Footballers from Caen
French footballers
French sportspeople of Republic of the Congo descent
Association football wingers
Vitória S.C. players
Vitória S.C. B players
Stade Malherbe Caen players
Primeira Liga players
Campeonato de Portugal (league) players
Championnat National 3 players
French expatriate footballers
French expatriates in Portugal
Expatriate footballers in Portugal